"Overture" is a song by English rock band the Who, written by Pete Townshend. The track is one of three instrumental tracks released on Tommy, the other two being "Underture" and "Sparks".

On 9 October 1970, the song was released as the B-side of "See Me, Feel Me" – which did not chart – and was titled "Overture from Tommy".

Song structure
As an overture the song features samples of Tommys themes:
0:00 – 0:32  Adapted from "1921"
0:33 - 0:36  Adapted from “The Hawker”
0:36 – 0:58  Adapted from "We're Not Gonna Take It"
0:59 – 1:33  Adapted from "Go to the Mirror!"
1:34 – 1:55  Adapted from "See Me, Feel Me"
1:56 – 2:18  Adapted from "Go to the Mirror!"
2:19 – 2:55  Adapted from "Listening to You"
2:56 - 3:03  Adapted from “Go to the Mirror!”
3:04 – 3:19  Adapted from "We're Not Gonna Take It"
3:20 – 3:50  Adapted from "Pinball Wizard”

There is no pause between the tracks "Overture" and "It's a Boy" so the songs are often combined as "Overture".

The Assembled Multitude version
The Assembled Multitude, an instrumental ensemble group from Philadelphia, Pennsylvania, scored with a remake of "Overture" which peaked at #16 in August, 1970 on the Billboard Hot 100 chart.

References

Rock instrumentals
Songs written by Pete Townshend
1970 singles
The Who songs